Mark Mason is an American business executive, serving since 2019 as the chief financial officer (CFO) of Citigroup. He is one of the few first black executives on Wall Street.

Early life and education
Mason was raised in Queens, New York, and as a teenager he worked for his grandparents, who ran carpentry and landscaping businesses. He earned of Bachelor of Business Administration (BBA) degree in finance and graduated with honors from Howard University. He then went on to earn a Master of Business Administration (MBA) degree from Harvard Business School.

Career
Mason joined Citigroup in 2001 and has held a number of executive positions at the firm, including Chief Financial Officer of Citi’s Institutional Clients Group, Chief Executive Officer of Citi Private Bank, Chief Executive Officer of Citi Holdings, and Chief Financial Officer and Head of Strategy and M&A for Citi’s Global Wealth Management Division. Mason is currently the firm’s CFO.

Board Membership
Mason has been on the Board of Trustees of Howard University since 2012 and has been vice chair of the Board of Trustees since July 1, 2017.

References

Citigroup employees
Harvard Business School alumni
Howard University alumni
People from Queens, New York
African-American businesspeople
Chief financial officers
Year of birth missing (living people)
Living people
21st-century African-American people